The NJC 3YO Spring Stakes is a Newcastle Jockey Club  Group 3 Thoroughbred horse race for three-year-olds at set weights, over a distance of 1600 metres, held annually at Broadmeadow Racecourse, Newcastle, New South Wales, Australia in november. Total prize money for the race is A$200,000.

History
Due to the reconstruction of the Broadmeadow Racecourse in 2016 the event was rescheduled for February 2017 and held at Randwick Racecourse.

Grade
 1984–1998 - Listed race
 1999 onwards - Group 3

Winners

 2022 - Pierossa
 2021 - Festival Dancer
 2020 - The Elanora
 2019 - Asiago
 2018 - Aramayo
 2017 (September) - Astoria
 2017 (February) - ‡Invincible Gem
 2015 - Devil Hawk
 2014 - Sweynesse
 2013 - Savvy Nature
 2012 - Proisir
 2011 - Darci Be Good
 2010 - Ilovethiscity
 2009 - Lovemelikearock
 2008 - Sousa
 2007 - †race not held
 2006 - Mearas
 2005 - Hotel Grand
 2004 - Lotteria
 2003 - Allgunadoit
 2002 - Clangalang
 2001 - Magic Albert
 2000 - Universal Prince
 1999 - Shogun Lodge
 1998 - Dracula
 1997 - Encounter
 1996 - Ebony Grosve
 1995 - Vernal
 1994 - Obsessed
 1993 - Mistador
 1992 - Coronation Day
 1991 - Enjoy Dancing
 1990 - Bright Kite
 1989 - Procol Harum
 1988 - Royal Pardon
 1987 - All Ashore
 1986 - Imprimatur
 1985 - Easter
 1984 - Blazing Devil

† Not held because of outbreak of equine influenza 

‡ Due to the reconstruction of the Broadmeadow Racecourse in 2016 the event was rescheduled for 11 February 2017 and held at Randwick Racecourse.

See also
 List of Australian Group races
 Group races

References

Horse races in Australia
Sport in Newcastle, New South Wales